In the German legal system, the obsolete designation Gerichtsassessor was held by judges or federal prosecutors, whose employment status today would be "on probation". Attainment of the second state legal qualification (the so-called "Competence to the Justiceship") was always a pre-requisite. The appointment took place with the intention that the Gerichtsassessor would be employed later in his lifetime as a judge.

The Gerichtsassessor usually held this designation for one year after receiving his Certificate of Appointment, before being appointed as a judge.

See also 
 Jurist

Judiciary of Germany
Region-specific legal occupations